Maroon is a surname. Notable people with the surname include:

 Anthony Maroon, Australian radio presenter
 Darren Maroon (born 1966), Australian rugby league player
 Fred J. Maroon (1924–2001), American photographer
 Patrick Maroon (born 1988), American professional ice hockey player